Hemaris croatica is a moth of the family Sphingidae. It was described by Eugenius Johann Christoph Esper in 1800.

Distribution 
It is found in Balkans, Anatolia and the Caucasus to Iran. Along the Mediterranean coast it is found up to northern Israel. There are local populations on the Crimea and in eastern Ukraine and western Kazakhstan.

Description 
In the north and in mountainous areas it flies in one generation in July. In warm areas it flies in two generations from May to June and in August.

Biology 
The larvae have been recorded on Scabiosa, Cephalaria, and Asperula species.

Subspecies
Hemaris croatica croatica
Hemaris croatica fahira de Freina, 2004 (Iran)

References

External links
Moths and Butterflies of Europe and North Africa
Lepiforum.de

croatica
Moths of Asia
Moths of Europe
Moths of the Middle East
Insects of Turkey
Moths described in 1800
Taxa named by Eugenius Johann Christoph Esper